Oceana Company was a Dutch indie rock band comprising Matthijs Herder (vocals/guitar/mellotron), Michiel Ferweda (guitar), Han Schilder (bass guitar) & Robert Koole (drums). Their music is notable for its melancholic and psychedelic overtones, and the use of authentic keyboard instruments, such as a mellotron. Their 2008 debut album 'For The Boatman' was produced by Marcel v/d Vondervoort of Astrosoniq and released by Spacejam Records/Suburban Records. Their song 'Trenchfever' reached number 1 in the Dutch Indiechart in May 2008. In 2009 the band was selected for the Dutch Popronde 2009.

Discography

Studio albums 

 Promo 2007 (EP), 2007
 For The Boatman, 2008

References

External links 

Band's official homepage
Band's own myspace page
Interview 'Lords Of Metal'
Musicfrom.nl interview track-by-track analyses 'For The Boatman'
OOR review
Debuutalbum voor Oceana Company, De Stentor
CD van Zwolse band met roots in Emmeloord, De Stentor
Programma festival No Bowling rond, Friesch Dagblad
The Pineapple Thief en de Oceana Company, LiveXS
Oceana Company - For The Boatman, dprp.net

Dutch indie rock groups
Dutch progressive rock groups
Musical groups established in 2004
Musical groups disestablished in 2013
2004 establishments in the Netherlands
2013 disestablishments in the Netherlands